Wendee M. Wechsberg (born in Miami, Florida) is an American social science researcher. Wechsberg's research focuses on developing and testing the efficacy of HIV prevention interventions among key populations of substance abusers globally. She is a recognized expert in the fields of substance abuse, gender inequality, and HIV. She developed the Women's CoOp intervention, a woman-focused behavioral HIV intervention that incorporates gender- and culture-specific skills training. Wechsberg is a Principal Researcher and Director of the Substance Use, Gender, and Applied Research (SUGAR) Program at RTI International and Director of the RTI Global Gender Center. She is also adjunct professor at the University of North Carolina at Chapel Hill (UNC) Gillings School of Global Public Health, Adjunct Professor of Psychology at North Carolina State University (NCSU), and adjunct professor in Psychiatry and Behavioral Sciences at Duke University School of Medicine.

Education
Wechsberg received a Bachelor of Arts degree from the University of South Florida in 1975. She received her Master of Science degree in Human Developmental Counseling from Peabody College at Vanderbilt University in 1979, and her doctorate in Community Psychology from North Carolina State University in 1993.

Career
Since 1994, Wechsberg has applied mixed methods research to develop and test the efficacy of HIV prevention interventions among diverse populations of people who use substances, particularly at-underserved populations of women, adolescent girls, and couples. Wechsberg began working full-time at RTI International as a Research Psychologist in 1996 and became Director of the Substance Use, Gender, and Applied Research (SUGAR)Program, formerly known as the Substance Abuse Treatment, Evaluations, and Interventions program, in 1999. In 2013, she also became Director of the RTI Global Gender Center, an initiative that includes over 300 affiliates and experts worldwide who work collaboratively to identify and address gender inequalities and disparities through innovative research and science. 
 
Additionally, Wechsberg started the International Women's and Children's Health and Gender (InWomen's) Group in 2007 with support from the National Institute on Drug Abuse. She serves as Chair of the InWomen's Group, a multidisciplinary forum addressing all aspects of substance use among women, children, and youth. The group comprises more than 200 members from 40 countries. InWomen's hosts its own satellite meeting annually before the College on Problems of Drug Dependence Conference. She was also recently appointed as the President of WomenNC. Dr. Wechsberg was recently announced to be a part of the 2022 Forbes 50 over 50 Impact list.

Research and impact
Wechsberg has served as principal investigator and project director on studies with the U.S. Centers for Disease Control and Prevention, the Robert Wood Johnson Foundation, the National Institute of Child Health and Human Development, the National Institute on Alcohol Abuse and Alcoholism, and the National Institute on Drug Abuse. She has been conducting international research in South Africa with at-risk substance-using women and adolescent girls since 2001, and more recently with couples. In 2008, Wechsberg was ranked third among all researchers funded by the National Institutes of Health who received HIV/AIDS investigator-initiated grants with research in the United States and internationally.

Wechsberg is the creator of the woman-focused HIV prevention program, the Women's CoOp, which was developed in 1998. The original Women's CoOp study was funded by NIDA for more than 10 years, and is a CDC best-evidence HIV behavioral prevention intervention. It has been adapted specifically for underserved and vulnerable adult and adolescent women in the United States, as well as in multiple regions in South Africa, the Republic of Georgia, and Russia.

The RTI Global Gender Center hosted a conference on "Ending Gender Inequalities: Addressing the Nexus of HIV, Drug Use, and Violence with Evidence-based Action". Wechsberg served as the Conference Chair. The conference spotlighted successful evidence-informed gender research and practice, and strategized solutions to broaden intervention implementation in usual care settings through engaging plenaries, panels, and multilevel collaborative sessions. Conference attendees included international participants, such as gender experts, civil society, leading researchers, policymakers, survivors, implementing partners, and students

The impact of Wechsberg's gender-focused work has been recognized both nationally and internationally. Notably her work with high-risk women, adolescents, and couples in South Africa has produced the Women's Health CoOp, the Young Woman's CoOp, and the Couples' CoOp, which are adaptations of the original intervention and effective tools to reduce not only HIV, but violence and drug use – all of which are highly prevalent in the country. Recently, Wechsberg began developing a mobile app that would make the Young Women's CoOp more accessible to adolescent and young adult women at-risk for HIV. If the mobile app version of the Young Women's CoOp is found to be as effective as the face-to-face intervention it could be the first mobile app to deliver an evidenced-based, women-focused HIV intervention for young women.

Ongoing studies
 Couples Health CoOp Plus (2021 to 2026)
PrEPaRE Pretoria: PRevention Empowering and PRotEcting Young Women in South Africa (2017 to 2022)
 Young Women-Focused HIV Prevention: Seek & Test in North Carolina Clinics (2015 to 2021)
 Implementation Research of the Women's Health CoOp in South Africa (2014 to 2021)

Recently completed studies
Expanding HIV Testing and Prevention to Reach Vulnerable Young Women (2015 to 2020)
Linking High-Risk Young Women to HIV Prevention and Care for Comorbid Conditions (2015 to 2018)
Combination Prevention for Vulnerable Women in South Africa (2011 to 2017)
Developing Empowering Strategies for Drug-Using Female School Dropouts in Cape Town (2014 to 2016)
 HIV/STI Risk Reduction for Incarcerated Women with Interpersonal Violence (2011 to 2015)
 HIV and Drug Use in Georgian Women (2010 to 2015)

Professional activity

Selected advisory boards
 Women North Carolina (NC) Advisory Board, 2018 to date; President, 2020 to date 
 Friends Committee, board member, 2017 to date
 NC HIV Prevention Work group 2016 to date 
 Center for AIDS Research (CFAR), Internal Advisory Board, University of North Carolina, 1999 to date
 NC Community Advocates Advisory Committee (Against Trafficking) 2017–2018
 North Carolina Community AIDS Fund, board member, 2011−2014
 Comprehensive International Programme for Research on AIDS in South Africa (CIPRA–SA), Scientific Advisory Board, Cape Town, South Africa, 2002−2008

Selected associations
 NAADAC, Association for Addiction Professionals
 Addiction Professionals of North Carolina
 American Association of Community Psychology
 American Psychological Association
 American Public Health Association
 College on Problems of Drug Dependence
 International AIDS Society

Selected awards and recognition
 Margaret Elliot Knox Excellence Award, RTI International, 2018 
 Pioneer Certificate, Two Decades of International Collaborations, NIDA, 2015
 Women in Business, Mentoring, Triangle Business Journal, 2014
 NIDA International Mentoring Award, 2013
 10 Area People Working To Change the World, Triangle Business Journal, 2007
 RTI President's Award—recognized for innovative adaptation of a U.S.-developed research and intervention protocol for HIV/AIDS treatment and prevention programs in South Africa, 2002

 Forbes 50 over 50 for Impact

Books, chapters, and monographs
 Wechsberg, Wendee M, Ed., (2018). HIV pioneers: Lives Lost, Careers Changed, and Survival. Co-published. Baltimore, MD: The Johns Hopkins University Press; Research Triangle Park, NC: RTI Press.
 Wechsberg, W., Anderson, S., & Howard, B. N. (2017). Ending gender inequalities: Addressing the nexus of HIV, drug use, and violence with evidence-based action, April 12–13, 2016. (RTI Press Publication No. CP-0003-1704). Research Triangle Park, NC: RTI Press. https://doi.org/10.3768/rtipress.2017.cp.0003.1704 
 Wechsberg, W., Parry, C. DH., & Jewkes, R.(2010). Drugs, sex, gender-based violence, and the intersection of the HIV/AIDS epidemic with vulnerable women in South Africa. (RTI Press Publication No. PB-0001-1005). Research Triangle Park, NC: RTI Press. https://doi.org/10.3768/rtipress.2010.PB.0001.1005

Reception of "On HIV Pioneers: Lives Lost, Careers Changed, and Survival"
 “A moving and essential addition to the history of our effects in confronting the epidemic.”  - Paul A. Volberding, MD, University of California, San Francisco, School of Medicine
 “Wechsberg has assembled many of the key players to create a verbal AIDS quilt, a tapestry rich in poignancy, wisdom, sadness, and hope.” – Kenneth H. Mayer, MD, Harvard T.H. Chan School of Public Health
 “A quietly powerful book.” – Gerald Friedland, MD, Professor Emeritus, Yale School of Medicine.

Selected publications

 Bonner, C.P., Carney, T., Browne, F.A., Ndirangu, J.W., Howard, B.N., Wechsberg, W.M. (14 December 2020). "Substance use and depressive and anxiety symptoms among out-of-school adolescent girls and young women in Cape Town, South Africa" South African Medical Journal. 111(1): 33–39. doi: 10.7196/SAMJ.2020.v111i1.14520.  PMID 33404004.  
Gichane, M. W., Wechsberg, W. M., Ndirangu, J., Browne, F. A., Bonner, C. P., Grimwood, A., ... & Zule, W. A. (1 October 2020). "Implementation science outcomes of a gender-focused HIV and alcohol risk-reduction intervention in usual-care settings in South Africa" Drug and Alcohol Dependence, 215: 108206, doi: 10.1016/j.drugalcdep.2020.108206. PMID 32771909; PMCID: PMC7502463. 
Wechsberg, W. M., Browne, F. A., Ndirangu, J., Bonner, C. P., Minnis, A. M., Nyblade, L., ... & Ahmed, K. (2020). "The PrEPARE Pretoria Project: protocol for a cluster-randomized factorial-design trial to prevent HIV with PrEP among adolescent girls and young women in Tshwane, South Africa" BMC Public Health, 20(1): 1–14. doi: 10.1186/s12889-020-09458-y. PMCID: PMC7490774. PMID 32933510
Doherty, I. A., Browne, F. A., & Wechsberg, W. M. (2020). "Think Inside the Box: the Heterogeneity of “in Risk” Among “at Risk” Female African American Adolescents in North Carolina" (December 2020) Journal of Racial and Ethnic Health Disparities, 7(6): 1–10. doi: 10.1007/s40615-020-00739-1. PMID 32297304
Belus, J. M., Baucom D. H., & Wechsberg, W. M. (2020). "Individual and relationship predictors of couple-level sexual concurrency in heterosexual South African couples" Archives of Sexual Behavior, 49(3): 999–1015. doi: 10.1007/s10508-019-1444-3. 
Belus, J. M., Kline, T., Carney, T., Myers, B., & Wechsberg, W. M. (2020). "Measuring relationship functioning in South African couples: A strategy for improving HIV prevention efforts" Sexual and Relationship Therapy, 35(1): 2–14. doi: 10.1080/14681994.2017.1419559. PMID 32728347. PMCID: PMC7388832. 
Peterson Williams, P, Washio, Y., Myers, B., Jaspan, H., Browne, F.A., Wechsberg, W.M. (December 26, 2019).  "Cannabis use and breastfeeding: do we know enough?" South African Journal of Psychology 50(1): 1–4. doi: 10.1177/0081246319893934 journals.sagepub.com/home/sap
Myers, B., Carney, T., Johnson, K., Browne, F.A., & Wechsberg, W.M. (January 2020). "Service providers’ perceptions of barriers to the implementation of trauma-focused substance use services for women in Cape Town, South Africa" International Journal of Drug Policy. doi: 10.1016/j.drugpo.2019.102628. PMID 31830616. PMCID: PMC7021212.
McCauley, H. L., Richie, F., Hughes, S., Johnson, J. E., Zlotnick, C., Rosen, R. K., ... Kuo, C. C. (18 April 2019). "Trauma, power, and intimate relationships among women in prison" Violence Against Women. 26(6-7):659-674. https://doi.org/10.1177/1077801219842948
Meyer, JP, Isaacs, K, El-Shahawy, O, Burlew, K.A., & Wechsberg, WM. (1 April 2019). "Research on women with substance use disorders: Reviewing progress and developing a research and implementation roadmap" Drug and Alcohol Dependence. doi.org/10.1016/j.drugalcdep.2019.01.017. PMID 30826625 PMCID: PMC6440852.
Belus, J.M., Baucom, D. H., Carney, T., Carrino, E. A., & Wechsberg, W. M. (November—December 2019). "A South African couple-based HIV prevention program: preliminary evidence of the long-term effects" The Journal of the Association of Nurses in AIDS Care: JANAC. 30(6):648-657 doi: 10.1097/JNC.0000000000000074. PMID 30958405.
Kline, T., Owens, C., Bonner, C.P., Carney, T., Browne, F.A., & Wechsberg, W.M. (2019) "Accuracy and utility of the AUDIT-C with adolescent girls and young women (AGYW) who engage in HIV risk behaviors in South Africa" Journal of Applied Measurement, 10(2): 132–142. PMID 30789836
Kuo, C, Rosen, R.K., Zlotnick, Wechsberg, W.M., Peabody, M., Johnson, J.E., (2019). "Sexual health prevention for incarcerated women: Eroticizing safe sex during re-entry to the community" BMJ Sexual & Reproductive Health, 45(1): 17–22. https://doi.org/10.1136/bmjsrh-2017-200024. PMID 29954877. PMCID: PMC7250161.

 
 
 
 
 
 
 
 
 
 Wechsberg, W. M., El-Bassel, N., Carney, T., Browne, F. Myers, B., & Zule, W. (2015). Adapting an evidence-based HIV behavioral intervention for South African couples. Substance Abuse Treatment Prevention and Policy, 10(1), 6. doi: 10.1186/s13011-015-0005-6

References

American social scientists
Women social scientists
People from Miami
University of South Florida alumni
Peabody College alumni
North Carolina State University alumni
Year of birth missing (living people)
Living people